Cory Maloy (born July 31, 1962) is an American politician who has served in the Utah House of Representatives from the 6th district since 2017. The 6th district was changed to the 52nd district due to redistricting where Maloy was re-elected in 2022.

References

1962 births
Living people
Republican Party members of the Utah House of Representatives
21st-century American politicians